Rolando Gabriel Dy (born August 11, 1990) is a retired Filipino mixed martial artist. He most notably fought in the Ultimate Fighting Championship (UFC) and Brave Combat Federation. He is the former Abu Dhabi Warriors featherweight champion. He is the son of former WBC World super featherweight title holder Rolando Navarrete.

Mixed martial arts career 
Dy made his professional debut on a Nemesis MMA card in Quezon City, Philippines where he won by TKO in the 2nd round. He had 3 straight wins in Pacific Xtreme Combat (PXC) before signing with the UFC as a replacement fighter on two weeks notice.

Ultimate Fighting Championship 
Dy's UFC debut was against TUF alum, Alex Caceres on June 17, 2017, in UFC Fight Night: Holm vs. Correia. Dy was dominated by the UFC veteran until the fight was stopped between the 2nd and 3rd rounds due to a cut on Dy's right eye. It was ruled as a TKO victory for Caceres.

On September 23, 2017, Dy faced Teruto Ishihara in UFC Fight Night: Saint Preux vs. Okami. He lost the fight via unanimous decision. The bout could've resulted to a majority draw if not for a point deduction from Dy for repeated groin strikes to Ishihara. The scores read 28–27, 28-27 and 29–27.

Dy confirmed that he was cut from the roster via email after 2 consecutive losses. However, he was offered a fight against UFC newcomer Wuliji Buren in UFC Fight Night: Bisping vs. Gastelum on November 25, 2017, as a late replacement. At the weigh-ins, Dy weighed in at 148 lbs., two pounds over the featherweight limit. As a result, he forfeited 20% of his purse to Buren and the bout was fought at a catchweight. Dy won the fight by unanimous decision.

Dy faced Shane Young on June 23, 2018, at UFC Fight Night 132. He lost the fight via technical knockout in the second round. This fight earned him his first Fight of the Night award. Later, he was subsequently released by the UFC.

Post-UFC 
After being released by the UFC, Dy fought in two Middle East based promotions and captured the Abu Dhabi Warriors featherweight Championship on May 6, 2019.

Dy was scheduled to defend his UAE Warriors title against Austin Arnett at ADW 6 on October 18, 2019. However, Arnett withdrew from the bout due to an injury and was replaced by Do Gyeom Lee. Dy lost the bout via knockout.

After the title loss, Dy returned to Brave CF, facing Anzor Abdulkhozhaev at Brave CF 33 on December 27, 2019. He lost the bout via technical knockout in the first round.

Dy faced Maciek Gierszewski at Brave CF 42 on September 24, 2020. He won the fight via split decision.

Just over a month removed from his previous bout, Dy faced John Brewin at Brave CF 44 on November 5, 2020. Dy won the bout via unanimous decision.

Dy faced Abdisalam Kubanychbek at BRAVE CF 47 on March 11, 2021. He lost the fight via corner stoppage between the second and third round.

Dy faced Slobodan Maksimović on December 18, 2021, at Brave CF 56. He lost the bout via controversial unanimous decision.

Dy faced Ho Taek Oh on April 30, 2022, at Brave CF 58. He lost the bout in the first round after getting dropped and then submitted via rear-naked choke.

Dy faced Olzhas Eskaraev on September 30, 2022 at Brave CF 62. He lost the bout after getting knocked out in the second round and retired after the bout.

Championships and achievements

Mixed martial arts 
 Ultimate Fighting Championship
Fight of the Night (One time) 
Abu Dhabi Warriors
 ADW Featherweight Championship (One time)

Mixed martial arts record

|-
|Loss
|align=center|14–13 (1)
|Olzhas Eskaraev
|KO (punches)
|Brave CF 62
|
|align=center|2
|align=center|3:40
|Almaty, Kazakhstan
|
|-
|Loss
|align=center|14–12 (1)
|Ho Taek Oh
|Submission (rear-naked choke)
|Brave CF 58
|
|align=center|1
|align=center|3:29
|Incheon, South Korea
|
|-
|Loss
|align=center|14–11 (1)
|Slobodan Maksimović
|Decision (unanimous)
|Brave CF 56
|
|align=center|3
|align=center|5:00
|Belgrade, Serbia
|
|-
|Loss
|align=center|14–10 (1)
|Abdysalam Uulu Kubanychbek
|TKO (corner stoppage)
|Brave CF 47
|
|align=center|2
|align=center|5:00
|Arad, Bahrain
|
|-
|Win
|align=center|14–9 (1)
|John Brewin
|Decision (unanimous)
|Brave CF 44
|
|align=center|3
|align=center|5:00
|Riffa, Bahrain
|
|-
|Win
|align=center|13–9 (1)
|Maciek Gierszewski
|Decision (split)
|Brave CF 42
|
|align=center|3
|align=center|5:00
|Riffa, Bahrain
|
|-
|Loss
|align=center|12–9 (1)
|Anzor Abdulkhozhaev
|TKO (punches)
|Brave CF 33
|
|align=center|1
|align=center|1:15
|Jeddah, Saudi Arabia
|
|-
|Loss
|align=center|12–8 (1)
|Do Gyeom Lee
|KO (punches)
|Abu Dhabi Warriors 6
|
|align=center|1
|align=center|3:05
|Abu Dhabi, UAE
|
|-
|Win
|align=center|12–7 (1)
|Erzhan Estanov
|Decision (unanimous)
|Abu Dhabi Warriors 6
|
|align=center|5
|align=center|5:00
|Abu Dhabi, UAE
|
|-
|Win
|align=center|11–7 (1)
|Mehmosh Raza
|TKO (punches)
|Brave 22: Storm of Warriors
|
|align=center|1
|align=center|4:04
|Manila, Philippines
|
|-
|Win
|align=center|10–7 (1)
|Izzeddine Al Derbani
|TKO (punches)
|Abu Dhabi Warriors 5
|
|align=center|1
|align=center|N/A
|Abu Dhabi, UAE
|
|-
|Loss
|align=center|9–7 (1)
|Shane Young
|TKO (elbow and punches)
|UFC Fight Night: Cowboy vs. Edwards
|
|align=center|2
|align=center|4:40
|Kallang, Singapore
|
|-
|Win
|align=center|9–6 (1)
|Wuliji Buren
|Decision (unanimous)
|UFC Fight Night: Bisping vs. Gastelum
|
|align=center|3
|align=center|5:00
|Shanghai, China
|
|-
| Loss
| align=center| 8–6 (1)
| Teruto Ishihara
| Decision (unanimous)
| UFC Fight Night: Saint Preux vs. Okami
| 
| align=center| 3
| align=center| 5:00
| Saitama, Japan
| Dy was deducted one point in round 3 due to repeated groin strikes
|-
| Loss
| align=center| 8–5 (1)
| Alex Caceres
| TKO (doctor stoppage)
| UFC Fight Night: Holm vs. Correia
| 
| align=center| 2
| align=center| 5:00
| Kallang, Singapore
| 
|-
| NC
| align=center| 8–4 (1)
| Nelson Paes
| NC (accidental head clash)
| Brave 5: Go For Glory
| 
| align=center| 1
| align=center| 0:28
| Mumbai, India
| 
|-
| Win
| align=center| 8–4
| Aydin Mrouki
| Decision (unanimous)
| Pacific Xtreme Combat 55
| 
| align=center| 3
| align=center| 5:00
| Parañaque, Philippines
| 
|-
| Win
| align=center| 7–4
| Koyomi Matsushima 
| KO (punch)
| Pacific Xtreme Combat 53
| 
| align=center| 1
| align=center| 0:23
| Parañaque, Philippines
| 
|-
| Win
| align=center| 6–4
| Miguel Mosquera
| Decision (unanimous)
| Pacific Xtreme Combat 51
| 
| align=center| 3
| align=center| 5:00
| Parañaque, Philippines
| 
|-
| Loss
| align=center| 5–4
| Kyle Aguon
| Decision (split)
| Pacific Xtreme Combat 48
| 
| align=center| 3
| align=center| 5:00
| Pasig, Philippines
|  
|-
| Loss
| align=center| 5–3
| Kyle Aguon
| Decision (split)
| Pacific Xtreme Combat 45
| 
| align=center| 5
| align=center| 5:00
| Mangilao, Guam
|  
|-
| Win
| align=center| 5–2
| Han Bin Park
| Decision (unanimous)
| Pacific Xtreme Combat 43
| 
| align=center| 3
| align=center| 5:00
| Pasig, Philippines
| 
|-
| Win
| align=center| 4–2
| Kyle Reyes
| Decision (unanimous)
| Pacific Xtreme Combat 39
| 
| align=center| 3
| align=center| 5:00
| Pasig, Philippines
| 
|-
| Win
| align=center| 3–2
| Arex Montalban
| Submission (armbar) 
| Pacific Xtreme Combat 37
| 
| align=center| 1
| align=center| 4:50
| Pasig, Philippines
| 
|-
| Loss
| align=center| 2–2
| Ev Ting
| Decision (unanimous)
| Legend Fighting Championship 10
| 
| align=center| 3
| align=center| 5:00
| Chek Lap Kok, Hong Kong
| 
|-
| Win
| align=center| 2–1
| Alde Alonzo de Zosa
| TKO (punches)
| Pacific Xtreme Combat 31
| 
| align=center| 2
| align=center| N/A
| Pasig, Philippines
| 
|-
| Loss
| align=center| 1–1
| Elliot Untalan
| Submission (rear-naked choke)
| Pacific Xtreme Combat 28
| 
| align=center| 1
| align=center| N/A
| Pasig, Philippines
| 
|-
| Win
| align=center| 1–0
| Ryan Taclan
| TKO (punches)
| Nemesis MMA - MMA Wars: New Blood
| 
| align=center| 2
| align=center| N/A
| Quezon City, Philippines
|

Bare knuckle boxing record

|-
|Win
|align=center|1–0
|Apisit Sangmuang		
|KO (punches)
|BKFC Asia 4: The Big Bash
|
|align=center|1
|align=center|0:42
|Bangkok, Thailand
|

See also
 List of male mixed martial artists

References

External links

1991 births
Living people
Filipino male mixed martial artists
Featherweight mixed martial artists
Mixed martial artists utilizing Muay Thai
Mixed martial artists utilizing boxing
Mixed martial artists utilizing Brazilian jiu-jitsu
People from Parañaque
Filipino Muay Thai practitioners
Filipino practitioners of Brazilian jiu-jitsu
Ultimate Fighting Championship male fighters